St. Mark's Church is Dublin-based, Pentecostal church belonging to Christian Churches Ireland, the Irish branch of the Assemblies of God denomination. It was previously a Church of Ireland parish church. It is on Pearse Street, east of Trinity College. The church has two Sunday services; 10am and 11:45am.

The church
It was consecrated by the Church of Ireland Archbishop of Dublin, Charles Cobbe, on St Mark's day (25 April) 1757.

St. Mark's closed in 1971. Its contents were distributed throughout the Church of Ireland, and the parish records were transferred to the Representative Church Body. After its closure the building was purchased by Trinity College Dublin which used it occasionally for exams and lectures.

The church was purchased by the Family Worship Centre, a Pentecostal assembly, in 1987, renovated, and re-opened as a place of worship.

The parish
The parish was cut off from that of St. Andrew by Act of Parliament in 1707. It corresponded to the civil parish of the same name.

The churchyard
The church was surrounded on three sides by a churchyard which contained a large number of graves. In the 18th and early 19th centuries it was a favourite target of body snatchers, owing to its proximity to Trinity College, which taught medicine. A wall was built around the churchyard to try to prevent access. In 1892-3 the wall was removed and a railing substituted.

Parishioners
Perhaps the most celebrated person associated with St. Marks is Oscar Wilde, who was baptised in the church. Olympic gold medalist Katie Taylor is a member of the congregation.

References and sources
Notes

Sources

External links
 St. Mark's Church Website

Protestant churches in Dublin (city)
Assemblies of God churches
Former Anglican churches